Acrocordia is a genus of lichenized fungi in the family Monoblastiaceae.

Species
 Acrocordia conoidea
 Acrocordia gemmata
 Acrocordia macrospora
 Acrocordia salweyi

References 

Eurotiomycetes
Lichen genera
Taxa named by Abramo Bartolommeo Massalongo